Daniel Chandler (born November 29, 1951) is an American wrestler. He competed at the 1976 Summer Olympics and the 1984 Summer Olympics. In 2013, Chandler was inducted into the National Wrestling Hall of Fame as a Distinguished Member.

References

1951 births
Living people
American male sport wrestlers
Olympic wrestlers of the United States
Wrestlers at the 1976 Summer Olympics
Wrestlers at the 1984 Summer Olympics
Sportspeople from Minneapolis
Pan American Games medalists in wrestling
Pan American Games gold medalists for the United States
Pan American Games bronze medalists for the United States
Wrestlers at the 1975 Pan American Games
Wrestlers at the 1979 Pan American Games
Wrestlers at the 1983 Pan American Games
Medalists at the 1975 Pan American Games
Medalists at the 1979 Pan American Games
20th-century American people